The tungehorn is a woodwind instrument used in traditional Norwegian music, which has a single-reed attached to a conical cow or goat horn.

The instrument is single-reeded, with a separate reed body inserted into the instrument (heteroglot aerophone). The reed, or tunge is generally made of juniper, but spruce, maple, and birch bark have been used, as well as metal.

The instrument is minimally documented, and nearly became extinct, and thus is little known in modern Norwegian folk music. The instrument appears to have been mainly prevalent in Norway, where at least 160 instrument have been attested, 100 of them photographically. The core areas are Hedmark, eastern Trøndelag and Oppland, and Agder. The instrument is not known outside of Scandinavia, though within that region several variants of the instrument are found.

There are two different theories as to the origin of the tungehorn. One is that the instrument was inspired by the European clarinet that came to the region in the 1700s and was widely used in folk music in the 1800s. This theory finds support in the facts that the areas of greatest prevalence of clarinets coincides with the areas of the tungehorn, and that almost all the documented tungehorn date from the 19th and 20th centuries, with no known tradition prior to the early 1800s. A second theory argues that the folk reed instruments existed in Scandinavia prior to the arrival of the European clarinet, noting that a few known instruments pre-date the arrival of the European clarinet, and that the tungehorn's playing style is more similar to medieval instruments like the bagpipe rather than the orchestral clarinet.

References

Further reading

 Atle Lien Jenssen, 2010. Tungehornet i Norge. Masteroppgave ved Høgskolen i Telemark, Institutt for folkekultur, Rauland. 
 Reidar Sevåg, 1973. Det gjallar og det læt. Samlaget.

Clarinets
Norwegian musical instruments
Hornpipes